"Hands Down" is a song by Dashboard Confessional that was originally recorded for the acoustic So Impossible EP in 2001, which told the story of a date that Chris Carrabba had in his late teens/early twenties. It was later re-recorded and released as the lead single for the LP A Mark, a Mission, a Brand, a Scar in 2003 with a full band. Carrabba has said that this song is about the best day and date that he's ever had, and introduces it as such at concerts. "Hands Down" was released to radio on July 15, 2003.

Track listing
UK Maxi Single
"Hands Down" 3:07
"I Do" 3:12
"Saints and Sailors" (MTV Unplugged Version) 2:33
"Hands Down" (Video CD-ROM)

Chart performance

References

2003 singles
Songs written by Chris Carrabba
2003 songs
Dashboard Confessional songs
Vagrant Records singles